Janina Susczewska-Siwy (born February 14, 1936 in Brzozówka near Grodno) is a Polish luger who competed in the late 1950s and early 1960s. She won two medals at the FIL World Luge Championships with a silver in the men's doubles event (1958) and a bronze medal in the women's singles event (1963).

References
 Hickok sports information on World champions in luge and skeleton.
 SportQuick.com information on World champions in luge 
 Zieleśkiewicz, Władysław. (1992). Gwiazdy zimowych aren. Encyklopedia sportu, Warsaw. 

1936 births
Polish female lugers
Living people
People from Hrodna District
People from Białystok Voivodeship (1919–1939)
20th-century Polish women